Hanahan High School is a public high school located in Hanahan, South Carolina, United States. It serves grades 9 through 12 and is a part of the Berkeley County School District. The principal is Tom Gallus.

History
Hanahan High School was opened in the fall of 1958 with 282 students, but demand quickly exceeded its capacity. An additional eight-room portion was begun on June 20, 1960 along the northern side of the original building. In 1969, a science wing of 11,000 square feet was added to the eastern end of the original building. Most of the original structure and additions were demolished and rebuilt starting in 2000 according to plans by F.W. Architects, Inc.

Notable alumni 

 Bryce Florie, former baseball pitcher
 Brandon Ford, former football player
 Marcus Howard, former football player
 Bobbie Phillips, actress

External links 
 School website

References

Public high schools in South Carolina
Schools in Berkeley County, South Carolina